Pleasure Club is an album by the American rock musician James Hall, released in 1996. Starting over in the 2000s, Hall named his band for the album.

Hall supported the album by opening for Rage Against the Machine on a European tour, and for Love and Rockets in the United States. Pleasure Club'''s first single was "Honky Time".

Production
The album was produced primarily by Phil Nicolo. Hall took more satisfaction from his live show, and regarded the album as a primer for what he could do onstage.

Critical receptionTrouser Press wrote that "Hall’s singing is more ragged and urgent; he’s finally developed a distinctive vocal style of his own." CMJ New Music Monthly stated that the album "finds [Hall] infusing a soulful, bluesy wail into a pastiche of '70s and '80s influences—sort of like what would have come after Raw Power if Iggy had followed Bowie into his Philadelphia soul phase." The Times-Picayune deemed it "an edgy, post-punk, post-pop brand of new rock."Guitar Player determined that "guitarist Lynn Wright supports ... Hall with sizzling treble tones, an acidic, razor-edged attack and a healthy eclecticism that embraces psychedelic R&B, blues-infused punk and neoroots balladry." The Sydney Morning Herald noted that Hall "has a sound sense of dynamics, knowing when to hold back, and when to let loose." The Philadelphia Inquirer opined that Pleasure Club'' "catches Hall in somewhat reserved demeanor—at times, he sounds as though he's emulating Jeff Buckley's moody moves."

AllMusic called the album "brilliant, powerful stuff," writing: "Much less obviously derivative than the Black Crowes or Lenny Kravitz, Hall's distinctive sound may remind you of the greats, but by album's end he's carved out his own niche."

Track listing

References

1996 albums
Geffen Records albums